Red Rain is the fourth album by Detroit rapper Dice, released in 2002 by Fallen Angelz Entertainment. On October 31, 2006, the album was reissued with a second disc, Evil Angelz Runnin Thru Hell.

Production 

After recording the album,  Dice claims that Colvin took his name off the Fallen Angelz ownership papers and didn't fairly compensate him for his service, "I gave Dice $10,000 in advance and was broke 2 months later". Fallen Angelz founder Russell Colvin claims that Dice agreed to put up $30,000 to bankroll the label, but never came up with his half.

Track listing

References

External links 
 Red Rain at Allmusic

2005 albums
Dice (rapper) albums